Ignatius Ajuru University of Education, (IAUE) is a Nigerian university previously known as Rivers State College of Education from June 1971- October 2009.

History of Ignatius Ajuru University of Education 

Ignatius Ajuru University of Education, (IAUE) was previously known as Rivers State College of Education from June 1971- October 2009. Rivers State College of Education was created as an autonomous body With the  College reaching an attainment of full maturity, as it became well placed to play a more dynamic role to the society. The sole purpose of establishing  the college with  a Governing Council which is responsible for the recruitment of staff and for the general and overall administrative and financial control of the institution. Following the transformation, Mr. E. Aguma, who was appointed Principal in January 1975, became the first Provost of the College while Dr. E.T. Green succeeded Mr. Alagoa as the Chairman of Council in June 1975. After an interregnum was created by the change of Government in the country in July 1975, a new Governing Council with Dr. F.A. Eke, as Chairman, and a new Provost, Mr. R.I.C. Koko, were appointed in November of the same year.                                                             

The first provost of the then college was Mr. E. Aguma in 1975 after the college was conferred as an autonomous body following successive transformations in the college at the time. The college moved to its permanent site at Rumuolumeni in January,1977 although some essential facilities were still lacking on the campus. This bold step was a definite milestone in the life of the institution, because physical presence on the spot has placed it in a better position to make further plans for its continued growth and improvement of existing facilities.  A unique event in the history of the College occurred on 11th March 1978 on the occasion of its official opening and first graduation ceremony of 462 students, who  received their diplomas on the successful completion of the Nigeria Certificate in Education (NCE) programme, consisting of four sets who passed their diploma exams between 1974 and 1977. On May 28, 1982, the College happily matriculated the pioneer students of the degree programme. By the end of the 1983/1984 academic session, a total of 3,169 students had successfully passed through the various programmes of the College. Out of the total figure, 2,504 students went through the NCE Programme, 531 students passed through the ACE programme and 134  students in the B. Ed. programme. It is of worthy to note that, out of all the Colleges of Education affiliated to the University of Ibadan, Rivers State College of Education was the only one offering the Bachelor of Education degree programme.

By 1980, the Government declared her intention  to initiate degree programmes in educational fields through Colleges of Education and the Rivers State Government decided to sponsor the programme in order to increase the number of teachers in the State. Prof. G.O.M. Tasie was appointed Provost of the College and was taxed with the duty of upgrading the college to a degree-awarding institution. The 1981/82 academic year witnessed the actual admission of candidates for degree programmes in Rivers State College of Education after his appointment. Note that, of  all the Colleges of Education affiliated to the University of Ibadan, Rivers State College of Education was the only one offering the Bachelor of Education degree programme. The Rivers State Government decided  to convert Rivers State College of Education into a university in 2009  to further provide opportunities for high quality education for Nigerians especially indigenes of the State. Given that the college had for a long time been awarding degrees in affiliation with the University of Ibadan, the transition from a college of education to a university should be easy for the institution. In addition, many graduates of the extinct Rivers State College of Education yearned  to improve their academic qualifications through the acquisition of university degrees, preferably within the environment they were acclimatized to. Ignatius Ajuru University of Education was established by the University of Education Law No. 8 of 2009 of the Rivers State Government passed by the Rivers State House of Assembly on 15 October 2009 and was approved by His Excellency, Chief Rotimi Amaechi, the then Executive Governor of Rivers State on 20 October 2009. IAUE became the second state-owned University.  The current Vice-Chancellor of IAUE is Prof. Okey Onuchukwu

Programmes 
Ignatius Ajuru University of Education offer the following programmes:

 Basic Studies
 Post Graduate School
 College of Continuing Education

Faculties 

There are currently six faculties of study in the University.                                                                                                               
 Faculty of Humanities
 Faculty of Social Sciences
 Faculty of Education
 Faculty of Business Studies (Management Sciences)
 Faculty of Natural and Applied Sciences
 Faculty of Vocational and Technical Education

Departments 
FACULTY OF BUSINESS STUDIES (MANAGEMENT SCIENCES)

Department of Accounting (PGD, MSc, Mphil/PhD and PhD)

 Financial Accounting
 Public Finance
 Taxation

Department of Management (PGD, MSc, Mphil/PhD and PhD)

 Entrepreneurship Studies
 Human Resource Management
 Industrial Relations
 Organizational Behaviour
 Production Management

Department of Marketing (PGD, MSc, Mphil/PhD and PhD)

 Marketing

Department of Office and Information Management (PGD, MSc, Mphil/PhD and PhD)

 Office and Information Management

FACULTY OF EDUCATION

Department of Curriculum Studies and Instructional Technology (MEd, Mphil/PhD and PhD)

 Adult Education
 Curriculum Studies
 Educational Technology
 Language Education
 Library and Information Science (BLS, PGDL, MLS MPHIL/PhD and PhD)
 Science Education

Department of Educational Foundations (MEd, Mphil/PhD and PhD)

 History and Policy of Education
 Philosophy of Education
 Sociology of Education

Department of Educational Management (MEd, Mphil/PhD and PhD)

 Administration of Higher Education
 Economics of Education
 Educational Administration
 Educational Leadership and Policy
 Educational Planning

Department of Primary Education Studies (MEd, Mphil/PhD and PhD)

 Early Childhood Education
 Primary Education

Department of Educational Psychology, Guidance and Counselling (MEd, Mphil/PhD and PhD)

 Educational Psychology
 Guidance and Counselling
 Measurement and Evaluation
 Special Education

Department of Library and Information Science  (PGDL, MLS, Mphil/PhD and PhD)                                                             

 Library and Information Science

FACULTY OF HUMANITIES

Department of English and Communication Art (PGD, MA, Mphil/PhD and PhD)

 Communication
 Language
 Literature

Department of Fine and Applied Arts (PGD, MA, Mphil/PhD and PhD)

 Art Education
 Art History
 Ceramics and Textile Design
 Graphic Design and Art Education
 Metal Design
 Painting
 Sculpture

Department of French and International Studies (PGD, MA, Mphil/PhD and PhD)

 African Literature
 French Language/Linguistics
 French Literature
 Translation Studies

Department of Religious and Cultural Studies (PGD, MA, Mphil/PhD and PhD)

 African Traditional Religion
 Biblical Studies
 Church History
 Comparative Religion
 Sociology of Religion

Department of History and Diplomatic Studies (PGD, MA, Mphil/PhD and PhD)

 African History
 Diplomacy and International Relations
 History and International Relations
 Political and Social History

Department of Music (PGD, MA, Mphil/PhD and PhD)

 African Music
 Conducting and Music Directing
 Music Performance
 Theory and Composition

FACULTY OF NATURAL AND APPLIED SCIENCES

Department of Biology (PGD, MSc, Mphil/PhD and PhD)

 Entomology and Pest Management
 Environmental Biology
 Environmental Parasitology
 Food and Industrial Microbiology
 Hydrobiology and Fisheries
 Plant Ecology
 Plant Physiology

Department of Chemistry (PGD, MSc, Mphil/PhD and PhD)

 Analytical Chemistry
 Environmental Chemistry

Department of Computer Science (PGD, MSc, Mphil/PhD and PhD)

 Computer Science
 Information Technology

Department of Human Kinetics, Health and Safety Studies (PGD, MSc, Mphil/PhD and PhD)

 Community Health
 Exercise Physiology
 Occupational Health and Safety
 Rehabilitation Therapy
 Reproductive Health
 Sports Administration and Marketing
 Sports Management
 Sports Medicine
 Sociology of Sports

Department of Integrated Science (PGD, MSc, Mphil/PhD and PhD)

 Basic and Environmental Science
 Basic Interpretations

Department of Mathematics and Statistics (PGD, MSc, Mphil/PhD and PhD)

 Mathematics
 Statistics

Department of Physics (PGD, MSc, Mphil/PhD and PhD)

 Applied Geophysics
 Environmental and Radiation Physics
 Solid State Physics/Electronics
 Theoretical Physics

FACULTY OF SOCIAL SCIENCES

Department of Economics (PGD, MSc, Mphil/PhD and PhD)

 Developmental Economics/Planning
 Environmental Economics
 International Economics
 Monetary Economics

Department of Geography and Environmental Studies (PGD, MSc, Mphil/PhD and PhD)

 Environmental Management
 Geomorphology
 Regional Development Planning
 Rural Development and Resource Management

Department of Sociology (PGD, MSc, Mphil/PhD and PhD)

 Criminology and Security Studies
 Industrial Relations and Human Resource Management
 Peace and Conflict Studies
 Sociology of Development
 Social Works and Social Welfare Administration

Department of Political Science (PGD, MSc, Mphil/PhD and PhD)

 Developmental Studies
 International Relations
 Local Government Administration
 Politics and Governance
 Political Theory
 Public Administration

FACULTY OF VOCATIONAL AND TECHNICAL EDUCATION (PGD, MSc, MSc.Ed, Mphil/PhD and PhD)

Department of Agriculture

 Agricultural Economics
 Agricultural Education
 Agricultural Extension
 Agronomy
 Animal Production
 Crop Science
 Fisheries and Aquaculture
 Soil Science

Department of Home Economics and Hospitality Management (PGD, MSc, MSc.Ed Mphil/PhD and PhD)

 Clothing and Textile
 Food and Nutrition
 Home Management
 Human and Family Development

Department of Industrial Technical Education (PGD, MSc, MSc.Ed, Mphil/PhD and PhD)

 Automobile Technology
 Building Technology
 Electrical/Electronics Technology
 Mechanical Technology

Address 
P.M.B. 5047

Rumuolumeni, Port Harcourt

Rivers State, Nigeria.

Photo Gallery

References

 
Universities and colleges in Port Harcourt
Public universities in Nigeria
Teachers colleges